Mycobacterium kansasii is a bacterium in the Mycobacterium genus. It is an environmental bacteria that causes opportunistic infections in humans, and is the one of the leading mycobacterial causes of human disease after tuberculosis and leprosy.

Description
Gram-positive, nonmotile, moderately-long to long, and acid-fast rods.

Colony characteristics
It forms smooth to rough colonies after 7 or more days of incubation and is considered a slow grower.
Colonies grown in dark are nonpigmented, when grown in light or when young colonies are exposed briefly to light, colonies become brilliant yellow (photochromogenic) according to the Runyon classification of Non-Tuberculous Mycobacteria. Oxygen is essential for the development of the pigment. If grown in a lighted incubator, most strains form dark red crystals of β-carotene on the surface and inside of colony.

Physiology
Its physiology is described as growth on Middlebrook 7H10 agar at 37°C within 7 days or more,
resistant to pyrazinamide and
susceptible to ethambutol.

Differential characteristics
It is closely related to the non-pathogenic, also slowly growing, nonpigmented, M. gastri.
Both species share an identical 16S rDNA but differentiation is possible by differences in the ITS and hsp65 sequences.
A commercial hybridisation assay (AccuProbe) to identify M. kansasii exists.

M. kansasii complex 
Several former subtypes of M. kansasii have been reclassified as closely related species, and along with M. gastri form the M. kansasii complex (MKC). The species in the MKC are
 Mycobacterium kansasii (former subtype I)
 Mycobacterium persicum (former subtype II)
 Mycobacterium pseudokansasii (former subtype III)
 Mycobacterium ostraviense (former subtype IV)
 Mycobacterium innocens (former subtype V)
 Mycobacterium attenuatum (former subtype VI)
 and Mycobacterium gastri

Discovery 
Mycobacterium kansasii was first described in 1952 after being identified as the cause of two cases of disease resembling human pulmonary tuberculosis at Kansas City General Hospital and the University of Kansas Medical Center.

Pathogenesis
M. kansasii may cause chronic human pulmonary disease resembling tuberculosis. Extrapulmonary infections, such as cervical lymphadenitis in children, cutaneous and soft tissues infections, and musculoskeletal system involvement are uncommon. Rarely it causes disseminated disease in patients with severely impaired cellular immunity (such as organ transplants or AIDS). Pre-existing lung disease such as silicosis is a risk factor. Mycobacterium kansasii occasionally involves the skin in a sporotrichoid pattern. It is unclear where people acquire the infection and person-to-person spread is not thought to occur. Tap water is believed to be the major reservoir associated with human disease. Biosafety level 2 is indicated.

Type strain
First and most frequently isolated from human pulmonary secretions and lesions.

Strain ATCC 12478 = CIP 104589 = DSM 44162 = JCM 6379 = NCTC 13024.

References

External links 

 
 Type strain of Mycobacterium kansasii at BacDive -  the Bacterial Diversity Metadatabase

Acid-fast bacilli
kansasii
Bacteria described in 1955